Park Street may refer to:

Places in England 
 Park Street, Hertfordshire, a village
 Park Street, a location in Slinfold parish, West Sussex

Streets in England 
 Park Street, Bristol
 Park Street, Mayfair,  London
 Former name of Parks Road, Oxford

Streets elsewhere 
 Park Street, Boston, Massachusetts, USA
 Park Street, Kolkata, India
 Park Street, Sydney, Australia

See also
 Park Street station (disambiguation)